The Roeliff Jansen Kill is a major tributary to the Hudson River. Roeliff Jansen Kill was the traditional boundary between the Native American Mahican and Wappinger tribes.

Its source is in the town of Austerlitz, New York, and its mouth is at the Hudson River at Linlithgo in the town of Livingston.

A major tributary is Shekomeko Creek.

Tributaries
 Klein Kill
 Doove Kill
 Fall Kill
 Ham Brook
 Shekomeko Creek - Native American Che-co-min-go, "place of eels".
 Bean River
 Punch Brook
 Noster Kill
 Preechey Hollow Brook
 Bashbish Brook 
 Cedar Brook
 Wright Brook
 City Brook
 Guilder Brook
 Ashley Hill Brook
 Lee Pond Brook
 Green River

History

Roeliff Jansen
Both Roeliff Jansen Kill and Roeliff Jansen Park outside Hillsdale, NY were named after Roeliff Jansen. However, Roeloff Jansz was not an uncommon name.

According to popular belief Roeloff Jansen (1602-1637) was  born on the island of Marstrand in Bohuslän, Sweden. In 1623, Jansen married Anneke Jans (1605-1663) who was from Flekkeroy, in Vest Agder, Norway. Following the birth of their first three children, they emigrated to New Netherland in 1630.
The couple settled in first Rensselaerwyck near what is now Albany, New York, where Jansen had an engagement as a tenant farmer for Kiliaen Van Rensselaer. About 1634, he moved his family to New Amsterdam where he acquired a 62-acre farm on Manhattan Island, today  in the Tribeca area of lower Manhattan. After his death, his widow married Domine Everardus Bogardus.

Willem Frijhoff suggests it more likely refers to Roelof Jansz Haes , an alderman in Manor of Rensselaerswyck who was a trader in Beverwyck about 1634. By one account, he and some others were returning from New Amsterdam one winter when their boat became icebound for several days. They crossed the ice to shore and exploring the area, discovered the stream. They named it after the highest ranking member of the party, who was the alderman. This story is sometimes conflated with that of Roeliff Jansen of Marstrand.

New York State Route 9G crosses the stream via the Roeliff Jansen Kill Bridge (also known as the Linlithgo Bridge), built in 1932.

Roeliff Jansen Park, in the town of Hillsdale, New York, is named after him. The Roeliff Jansen Community Library, which also serves the towns of Ancram, Copake, and Hillsdale.

Livingston Manor
In 1699, Robert Livingston built the manor house of Livingston Manor at Linlithgo at the mouth of the Roeloff Jansen Kill, where it flows into the Hudson. After his death, the stream formed a boundary between the manor left to his son Philip, and the estate created for his son Robert. In 1743, Philip Livingston, grandson of Robert, founded the Livingston Forge on the banks of the Roeliff Jansen Kill at "Scotchtown", later called Ancram after the town in Scotland where the Livingstons originated. It was at the Ancram iron works that the "Fort Montgomery Chain" was forged in 1776. The chain was placed across the Hudson River near West Point between Fort Montgomery and Fort Clinton, to keep the British fleet from sailing up the Hudson. In 1854, the foundry became a paper mill. Paper manufacturer Schweitzer-Mauduit International operates a plant at that location.

See also
List of rivers of New York

References

External links
Roeliff Jansen Historical Society

Rivers of Columbia County, New York
Rivers of Dutchess County, New York
Rivers of New York (state)
Tributaries of the Hudson River